Bad Schmiedeberg is a small town in the Wittenberg district of Saxony-Anhalt, Germany. It lies within the Düben Heath Nature Park.

History 
The town was first mentioned in 1206 as Smedeberg. In 1350, it was granted town rights.

Geography 
The town Bad Schmiedeberg consists of the following Ortschaften or municipal divisions:

Bad Schmiedeberg
Korgau
Meuro
Pretzsch
Priesitz
Schnellin
Söllichau
Trebitz

Main sights
The Evangelical Town Church was consecrated in 1453 as a Gothic hall church. 
Art Nouveau Kurhaus ("spa house") built in 1908.
Bundesradfahrerdenkmal (Federal Cyclists' Memorial), endowed by the Bund Deutscher Radfahrer (League of German Cyclists), dedicated on 17 June 1923 in honour of fallen and missing club members and sportsmen.

Cultural events 
Schmiedeberger Margarethenfest,  honouring Electress Margaret of Austria. In 2006, the festival marked its 575th year, and also the town's 800th anniversary of first documentary mention.

Politics

Town council 
CDU 6 seats
FDP 3 seats
PDS 3 seats
SPD 1 seat
Agriculture, environment nature 1 seat
Pro Bad Schmiedeberg 1 seat
independent 1 seat

Mayor 
Stefan Dammhayn was elected mayor on 3 April 2005. In April 2016 Martin Röthel (SPD) was elected mayor for seven years.

Sons and daughters of the town
 Johann Nicolaus Anton (1737-1813), Lutheran theologian
 Ernst Theumer (1890-1978), Austrian politician (SPÖ)
 Heinrich Schütz (1906-1986), concentration camp doctor

Personalities related to city
 Oskar Benecke (1874-1957 / 60), local historian and chronicler, conservationist and archive keeper,

Gallery

References

External links 

A British Prisoner of War's eyewitness memories of Bad Schmiedeberg in 1943-45, including the arrival of US and Russian troops into the town on April 30 1945

 
Badschmiedeberg
Spa towns in Germany
Wittenberg (district)